Kehtaa Hai Dil Baar Baar is a 2002 Indian Hindi romantic film directed by Rahul Dholakia and stars Jimmy Sheirgill, Kim Sharma and Paresh Rawal.

Plot

Ranchhod Rai Patel (Paresh Rawal) is an egotistical and arrogant self-made Gujarati man who arrived from India and settled in the New York area years ago. He started his career cleaning latrines and dirty clothes, then moved on to working in a restaurant, saving enough money to own one, and then finally owned twelve. He became an extremely successful real-estate magnate and was so big-headed that started calling himself "THE Roger Patel". He married Kamla and they were soon proud parents of two lovely daughters, Namrata and Ritu. When the girls are grown, the overprotective Roger arranges a marriage for Namrata with a property owner, a professional Patel man named Prem. Ritu Patel (Kim Sharma), a doctor, informs that she has met her soul mate also, Sunder Kapoor (Jimmy Sheirgill), who is part-Punjabi and part-Madrasi and is definitely not a Patel, nor a property owner, and not even a professional.

Cast

 Jimmy Sheirgill as Sunder Kapoor
 Kim Sharma as Ritu Patel
 Paresh Rawal as Ranchhod Rai "The Roger" Patel 
 Johnny Lever as Natwar
 Ranjeet as Immigration Officer 
 Neena Kulkarni as Kamla Patel

Soundtrack

References

External links
 

2000s Hindi-language films
2002 films
Films scored by Jatin–Lalit
Films set in the United States
Films directed by Rahul Dholakia
2002 directorial debut films